The 86th Fighter-Interceptor Squadron is an inactive United States Air Force unit.  Its last assignment was with the 79th Fighter Group at Youngstown Air Force Base, Ohio, where it was inactivated on 1 March 1960.

The squadron was first activated shortly after the United States entered World War II as the 86th Pursuit Squadron.  As the 86th Fighter Squadron It saw combat in the Mediterranean Theater of Operations and earned two Distinguished Unit Citations.  After the end of the war it became an element of the occupation forces until returning to the United States, where it was inactivated in 1947.

It was activated once again to replace an Air National Guard squadron that had been mobilized for the Korean War and carried out the air defense of the Great Lakes area for the next eight years.

History

World War II
The squadron was first activated in early 1942 at Dale Mabry Field, Florida as the 86th Pursuit Squadron, one of the original three squadrons of the 79th Pursuit Group. Its initial cadre was drawn from the 56th and 81st Fighter Groups. The squadron was redesignated the 86th Fighter Squadron in May 1942. The unit trained in the United States, then moved to Egypt by sea via Brazil in October–November 1942, where it became part of Ninth Air Force.

The squadron trained with P-40 Warhawks while moving westward in the wake of the British drive across Egypt and Libya to Tunisia. By escorting bombers, attacking enemy shipping, and supporting ground forces, the 86th took part in the Allied operations that defeated Axis forces in North Africa, captured Pantelleria, and conquered Sicily. The squadron was awarded a Distinguished Unit Citation (DUC) for its support of British Eighth Army during that period, March–August 1943.

The squadron became part of Twelfth Air Force in August 1943 and continued to support the British Eighth Army by attacking troop concentrations, gun positions, bridges, roads, and rail lines in southern Italy. It operated in the area of the Anzio beachhead from January to March 1944. The unit participated in the drive on Rome from March to June 1944, and converted to P-47 Thunderbolts during that time.  It flew escort and strafing missions in southern France during August and September 1944, and afterward returned to Italy and engaged in interdiction and close air support operations in northern Italy.  The 86th received a second DUC for numerous missions flown at minimum altitude in intense flak to help pierce the enemy line at the Santerno River in Italy in April 1945. Squadron pilots were credited with twenty-eight victories over enemy aircraft during World War II.

The squadron remained overseas as part of United States Air Forces in Europe after the war as part of the occupation forces. It was transferred, without personnel and equipment, to the US in June 1947 and inactivated on 15 July 1947.

Cold War Air Defense

The squadron was redesignated the 86th Fighter-Interceptor Squadron and activated in November 1952 at Youngstown Municipal Airport, where it replaced the federalized 166th Fighter-Interceptor Squadron, which was released to the Ohio Air National Guard. As an element of Air Defense Command (ADC) it was responsible for air defense of the Great Lakes area, initially with the Republic F-84 Thunderjets it inherited from the 166th.

Three months later ADC reorganized it dispersed fighter bases and the 86th Fighter-Interceptor Squadron was assigned to the 502d Air Defense Group, which assumed control of ADC operational and support elements at Youngstown. In July the squadron upgraded to radar equipped and rocket armed North American F-86D Sabres at Youngstown.

In August 1955 ADC implemented Project Arrow, which was designed to bring back on the active list the fighter units which had compiled memorable records in the two world wars. At Youngstown, the squadron's World War II headquarters, the 79th Fighter Group assumed the personnel and equipment of the 502d Air Defense Group, which was simultaneously inactivated.

In September 1957 the 86th traded its Sabres for AIM-4 Falcon armed Convair F-102 Delta Dagger aircraft equipped with data link for interception control through the Semi-Automatic Ground Environment system. The Air Force transferred command of Youngstown MAP from ADC to Continental Air Command on 1 March 1960 and the 79th Fighter Group and its components inactivated that date.

Lineage
 Constituted as the 86th Pursuit Squadron (Interceptor) on 13 January 1942
 Activated on 9 February 1942
 Redesignated 86th Fighter Squadron (Single Engine) on 15 May 1942
 Inactivated on 15 July 1947
 Redesignated 86th Fighter-Interceptor Squadron on 11 September 1952
 Activated on 1 November 1952
 Inactivated on 1 March 1960

Assignments
 79th Pursuit Group (later Fighter Group), 9 February 1942 – 15 July 1947
 4708th Defense Wing, 1 November 1952
 502d Air Defense Group, 16 February 1953
 79th Fighter Group, 18 August 1955 – 1 March 1960

Stations

 Dale Mabry Field, Florida, 9 February 1942
 Morris Field, North Carolina, 1 May 1942
 Hillsgrove Army Air Field, Rhode Island, 23 June 1942 – 28 September 1942
 Egypt 18 November 1942
 Al Amirya (Landing Ground LG-174), Egypt 19 November 1942
 Gazala, Libya (Landing Ground LG-150), 24 January 1943
 Daraugh North Landing Ground Libya, 7 February 1943
 Castel Benito Airdrome, Libya, 27 March 1943
 Causeway Airdrome, Tunisia 13 March 1943
 Sidi El Hani Landing Ground, Tunisia, 17 April 1943
 El Haouaria Airfield, Tunisia, 2 June 1943
 Bou Grara Airfield, Tunisia, 6 June 1943
 Causeway Airdrome, Tunisia 14 June 1943
 Malta, c. 4 July 1943
 Syracuse, Sicily, Italy c. 18 July 1943
 Cassibile Landing Ground, Sicily, Italy, 26 July 1943

 Palagonia Landing Ground, Sicily, Italy, 30 July 1943
 Isole Landing Ground, Sicily, Italy, 13 September 1943
 Pisticci Landing Ground, Italy, 24 September 1943
 Penny Post Landing Ground, Italy 26 September 1943
 Madna Airfield, Italy, c. 19 November 1943
 Capodichino Airport, Italy, 16 January 1944
 Pomigliano Airfield, Italy, 1 May 1944
 Serragia Airfield, Corsica 20 June 1944
 St. Raphael/Frejus Airfield (Y-12), France c. 25 August 1944
 Valance Airfield (Y-23), France, 30 September 1944
 Iesi Airfield, Italy, 4 October 1944
 Fano Airfield, Italy, 5 December 1944
 Cesenatico Airfield, Italy, 21 March 1945
 AAF Station Hoersching (later Hoersching Air Base), Austria, 26 July 1945 – 25 June 1947
 Langley Field, Virginia, 25 June 1947 – 15 July 1947
 Youngstown Municipal Airport, Ohio, 1 November 1952 – 1 March 1960

Aircraft

 Curtiss P-40 Warhawk, 1942–1944
 Republic P-47 Thunderbolt, 1944–1947
 Republic F-84C Thunderjet, 1952–1953

 North American F-86D Sabre, 1953–1957
 Convair F-102 Delta Dagger, 1957–1960

Awards and campaigns

References
 Notes

 Citations

Bibliography

 Buss, Lydus H.(ed), Sturm, Thomas A., Volan, Denys, and McMullen, Richard F., History of Continental Air Defense Command and Air Defense Command July to December 1955, Directorate of Historical Services, Air Defense Command, Ent AFB, CO, 1956

Further reading

 
 
 
 
 
 Woerpel, Don. The 79th Fighter Group: Over Tunisia, Sicily, and Italy in World War II. Atglen, Pennsylvania: Schiffer Publishing, 2007. .
 

086
Military units and formations in Ohio